This is a list of Canadian films which were released in 1988:

See also
 1988 in Canada
 1988 in Canadian television

1988
1988 in Canadian cinema
Canada